Saint-Estèphe (Limousin: Sent Estefe) is a commune in the Dordogne department in Nouvelle-Aquitaine in southwestern France.

Population

See also
Communes of the Dordogne department

References

External links

 Official website (in French)

Communes of Dordogne